Khalifehi (also Romanized as Khalīfeh’ī; also known as Deh-e-Khalīfeh, Deh-i-Khalifeh, Deh Khalīfeh, and Khalīfeh) is a village in Shabankareh Rural District of Shabankareh District, Dashtestan County, Bushehr province, Iran. At the 2006 census, its population was 1,225 in 363258households. The following census in 2011 counted 1,577 people in 373 households. The latest census in 2016 showed a population of 1,976 people in 547 households; it was the largest village in its rural district.

References 

Populated places in Dashtestan County